John Bernard Troy (2 October 1928 – 20 January 1995), was an Australian rugby league footballer who played as a er for Newtown and Eastern Suburbs in the New South Wales Rugby League (NSWRL), Australia's major rugby league competition. He also represented Australia internationally and New South Wales against Queensland.

Newtown career
The son of a jockey, Troy was a professional runner, who after missing Olympic selection began his rugby league career with the Newtown club in 1949 where he played 4 seasons. In just 34 appearances for Newtown, the winger, scored 37 tries.

He holds the Newtown club record for the most tries in a match, scoring 6 against Eastern Suburbs in 1950, a feat that would not be repeated for another 71 years in Australia until Josh Addo-Carr of the 
Melbourne Storm achieved this in round 9 of the 2021 NRL season   

Troy was the 1950 NSWRFL season top try scorer with 16 tries.

Representative career
In 1950, he played two matches for New South Wales and then was selected to represent Australia. He played in first Australian test side to win the ashes in 30 years in which he played in the first and third test. He is listed on the Australian Players Register as Kangaroo No. 276.

In 1953, Troy joined the Eastern Suburbs club, but he only played in 3 matches after a constant leg injury forced his retirement. Troy is recognized as the Newtown Jets 410th player and the Tricolours 415th player.

In his later years Jack Troy became chairman of selectors at the St. George club.

Troy died in 1995 aged 66.

References

External links
 The Encyclopedia Of Rugby League, Alan Whiticker and Glen Hudson
 History Of The New South Wales Rugby League Finals, Steve Hadden

1928 births
1995 deaths
Australian rugby league players
Newtown Jets players
Australia national rugby league team players
New South Wales rugby league team players
City New South Wales rugby league team players
Sydney Roosters players
Rugby league wingers